The 2017–18 season is the 86th season in Real Zaragoza ’s history.

Squad

Transfers
List of Spanish football transfers summer 2017#Zaragoza

Competitions

Overall

Liga

League table

Matches

Copa del Rey

References

Real Zaragoza seasons
Real Zaragoza